Michipicoten Island is an island in Ontario, Canada, in the northeastern part of Lake Superior, about  northwest of Sault Ste. It falls within the boundaries of Thunder Bay District.

Most of the lands of Michipicoten Island, as well as smaller islands, shoals, and waters which surround it to within , were regulated as Michipicoten Island Provincial Park in 1985. Despite attempts to develop a comprehensive park management plan in the early- to mid-2000s, it continues to be administered by Ontario Parks under an interim management statement developed in 1986.

During the spring, summer, and fall, the island is inhabited or regularly visited by the owners of camps located on a small number of private inholdings, commercial fishers, and clients of a commercial outpost camp. It has become a destination for some adventurous kayakers. In the winter, due mainly to reasons of remoteness and difficulty of access, the island is usually uninhabited.

Michipicoten Island has plentiful wildlife (notably beaver, woodland caribou, and birds). It is located in the Great Lakes-St. Lawrence Forest region.

The island is made up of ancient lava bedrock related to volcanism of the Midcontinent Rift System and is heavily forested, with over 20 inland lakes. It has a rugged interior, containing east-west aligned ridges with gentle southern slopes and steep northern slopes.

A lighthouse was established in 1912 on the eastern end of the island. It was staffed until 1988.

On some old maps, Michipicoten Island is shown as Isle Maurepas, after the French minister of Marine Jean-Frédéric Phélypeaux, Count of Maurepas. The word Michipicoten is an Anglicization of the original Ojibwe word Mishipikwadina, meaning "big bluffs" in Ojibwe, and is a reference to the geography of the nearby Michipicoten River.

Mishipeshu, a powerful creature in the traditional beliefs of some Native American tribes―particularly Anishinaabe tribes, the Odawa, Ojibwe, and Potawatomi, of the Great Lakes region of Canada and the United States―is traditionally said to make his home on Michipicoten Island.

Woodland caribou

Michipicoten Island played host to an indigenous caribou population until the herd's extirpation, as a result of overhunting, in the mid-1800s. In 1981, a lone male caribou was observed on the island; how it arrived there remains unknown. In 1982, additional caribou - one male, three adult females and three female calves - were moved to the island from the Slate Islands by the Ministry of Natural Resources. An additional male was translocated in 1989. A population determination performed in 2011 concluded that the herd had grown to 680 animals. At times, the rate of population growth was among the fastest ever recorded for caribou.

In the winter of 2014, four wolves transited to Michipicoten Island. This was facilitated by an ice bridge which had formed between the island and the mainland. The wolf population had more than tripled by the winter of 2016/2017. 

The caribou population of Michipicoten Island is scientifically significant because it manifests an opportunity to apply A. T. Bergerud's proposed test to assess the viability of the range hypothesis versus the predation hypothesis for providing a credible explanation for caribou population decline. Adapted to Michipicoten Island, Bergerud's proposed test was two-part: First, the caribou population on Michipicoten Island should increase despite the lack of lichen in the island's Great Lakes/St. Lawrence Forest. This happened, and it indicated that lichen was not a critical requirement in the diet of caribou. Second, after the appearance of wolves, the population of caribou should decline. Should these population trends emerge, it would indicate conclusively that wolf predation, and not a lack of lichen as forwarded by the range hypothesis, was a key factor in the decline of caribou throughout North America.

The caribou population of Michipicoten Island is ecologically significant because it and the Slate Islands caribou population are all that conclusively and verifiably remain of a caribou population which was once found throughout the federally-recognized ON6 Lake Superior caribou range. Ontario Ministry of Natural Resources and Forestry/Parks Canada 2016 caribou populations surveys failed to conclusively observe any caribou remaining in the lands along the north shore of Lake Superior.

As of March 2019 all of the remaining caribou and wolves had been moved off of the island due to the low remaining population of caribou. A pack of eight of the wolves were translocated to Isle Royale in 2018.

See also 
Henri de Miffonis

References

External links
Ontario government documents regarding Michipicoten Island
Description of a commercial kayaking trip to Michipicoten Island, with information about the island
1910 Log Book of the North Shore Club: Michipicoten / Wawa Region History
 Story of two sea kayakers rescued by the Coast Guard off Michipicoten Island

Provincial parks of Ontario
Uninhabited islands of Ontario
Islands of Lake Superior in Ontario
Parks in Thunder Bay District
Protected areas established in 1990
1990 establishments in Ontario